In psychology, false memory syndrome (FMS) is a condition in which a person's identity and relationships are affected by false memories of psychological trauma, recollections that are factually incorrect yet strongly believed. Peter J. Freyd originated the term partly to explain what he said was a false accusation of sexual abuse made against him by his daughter Jennifer Freyd and his False Memory Syndrome Foundation (FMSF) subsequently popularized the concept. The principle that individuals can hold false memories and the role that outside influence can play in their formation is widely accepted by scientists. However FMS is not recognized as a psychiatric illness in any medical manuals including the ICD-10 or the DSM-5.

False memory syndrome may be the result of recovered memory therapy, a term also defined by the FMSF in the early 1990s, which describes a range of therapy methods that are prone to creating confabulations. The most influential figure in the genesis of the theory is psychologist Elizabeth Loftus.

Definition 
False memory syndrome is a condition in which a person's identity and interpersonal relationships center on a memory of a traumatic experience that is objectively false but that the person strongly believes occurred.

The FMS concept is controversial, and the Diagnostic and Statistical Manual of Mental Disorders does not include it. Paul R. McHugh, member of the FMSF, stated that the term was not adopted into the fourth version of the manual due to the pertinent committee being headed by believers in recovered memory.

Recovered memory therapy 

Recovered memory therapy is used to describe the therapeutic processes and methods that are believed to create false memories and false memory syndrome. These methods include hypnosis, sedatives and probing questions where the therapist believes repressed memories of traumatic events are the cause of their client's problems. The term is not listed in DSM-IV or used by any mainstream formal psychotherapy modality.

Memory consolidation becomes a critical element of false memory and recovered memory syndromes. Once stored in the hippocampus, the memory may last for years or even for life, regardless of the fact that the memorized event never actually took place. Obsession to a particular false memory, planted memory, or indoctrinated memory can shape a person's actions or even result in delusional disorder.

That such techniques have been used in the past is undeniable. Their continued use is cause for malpractice litigation worldwide. An Australian psychologist was de-registered for engaging in them.

Psychiatric controversy concerning recovered memories 
In psychiatry, confabulation is a memory error defined as the production of fabricated, distorted, or misinterpreted memories about oneself or the world, without the conscious intention to deceive. Psychotherapists tried to reveal “repressed memories” in mental therapy patients through “hypnosis, guided imagery, dream interpretation and narco-analysis” in the 1980s. The reasoning was that if abuse couldn't be remembered, then it needed to be recovered by the therapist. This type of therapy became popular in the 1990s.
Many victims don't remember their abuse, making the underlying phenomenon of trauma-induced amnesia nonetheless legitimate.

Therapists who subscribe to recovered memory theory point to a wide variety of common problems, ranging from eating disorders to sleeplessness, as evidence of repressed memories of sexual abuse. The legal phenomena developed in the 1980s, with civil suits alleging child sexual abuse on the basis of “memories” recovered during psychotherapy. The term “repressed memory therapy” gained momentum and with it social stigma surrounded those accused of abuse. The therapy led to other psychological disorders in persons whose memories were recovered.

Evidence for false memories 
Human memory is created and highly suggestible, and can create a wide variety of innocuous, embarrassing, and frightening memories through different techniques—including guided imagery, hypnosis, and suggestion by others. Though not all individuals exposed to these techniques develop memories, experiments suggest a significant number of people do, and will actively defend the existence of the events, even if told they were false and deliberately implanted. Questions about the possibility of false memories created an explosion of interest in suggestibility of human memory and resulted in an enormous increase in the knowledge about how memories are encoded, stored and recalled, producing pioneering experiments such as the lost in the mall technique. In Roediger and McDermott's (1995) experiment, subjects were presented with a list of related items (such as candy, sugar, honey) to study. When asked to recall the list, participants were just as, if not more, likely to recall semantically related words (such as sweet) than items that were actually studied, thus creating false memories. This experiment, though widely replicated, remains controversial due to debate considering that people may store semantically related items from a word list conceptually rather than as language, which could account for errors in recollection of words without the creation of false memories. Susan Clancy discovered that people claiming to have been victims of alien abductions are more likely to recall semantically related words than a control group in such an experiment.

The lost in the mall technique is a research method designed to implant a false memory of being lost in a shopping mall as a child to test whether discussing a false event could produce a "memory" of an event that did not happen. In her initial study, Elizabeth Loftus found that 25% of subjects came to develop a "memory" for the event which had never actually taken place. Extensions and variations of the lost in the mall technique found that an average of one third of experimental subjects could become convinced that they experienced things in childhood that had never really occurred, even traumatic or impossible events.

Experimental researchers have demonstrated that memory cells in the hippocampus of mice can be modified to artificially create false memories.

Sexual abuse cases 
The question of the accuracy and dependability of a repressed memory that someone has later recalled has contributed to some investigations and court cases, including cases of alleged sexual abuse or child sexual abuse (CSA).  The research of Elizabeth Loftus has been used to counter claims of recovered memory in court and it has resulted in stricter requirements for the use of recovered memories being used in trials, as well as a greater requirement for corroborating evidence.  In addition, some U.S. states no longer allow prosecution based on recovered memory testimony.  Insurance companies have become reluctant to insure therapists against malpractice suits relating to recovered memories.

Supporters of recovered memories argue that there is "overwhelming evidence that the mind is capable of repressing traumatic memories of child sexual abuse." Whitfield states that the "false memory" defense is "seemingly sophisticated, but mostly contrived and often erroneous." He states that this defense has been created by "accused, convicted and self-confessed child molesters and their advocates" to try to "negate their abusive, criminal behavior." Brown states that when pro-false memory expert witnesses and attorneys state there is no causal connection between CSA and adult psychopathology, that CSA doesn't cause specific trauma-related problems like borderline and dissociative identity disorder, that other variables than CSA can explain the variance of adult psychopathology and that the long-term effects of CSA are non-specific and general, that this testimony is inaccurate and has the potential of misleading juries.

Malpractice cases 
During the late 1990s, there were multiple lawsuits in the United States in which psychiatrists and psychologists were successfully sued, or settled out of court, on the charge of propagating iatrogenic memories of childhood sexual abuse, incest, and satanic ritual abuse.

Some of these suits were brought by individuals who later declare that their recovered memories of incest or satanic ritual abuse had been false. The False Memory Syndrome Foundation uses the term retractors to describe these individuals, and have shared their stories publicly. There is debate regarding the total number of retractions as compared to the total number of allegations, and the reasons for retractions.

Injuries resulting from malpractice 
Sexual abuse of children and adolescents can lead to severe negative consequences. Child sexual abuse is a risk factor for many classes of psychiatric disorders, including anxiety disorders, affective disorders, dissociative disorders and personality disorders. Failure to meet recognized medical standards by psychiatrists causes injury to patients and the accused. Ramona v. Isabella was a prominent case of malpractice in 1994. A California jury awarded $500,000 to Gary Ramona, whose daughter Holly had falsely accused him of sexual abuse as a child, based on false memories retrieved by therapists during treatment for bulimia. Los Angeles Superior Court Judge Burton Bach dismissed Holly Ramona's civil case against her father, holding that the outcome of her father's malpractice suit had resolved the issue of whether any abuse took place. The Washington Post titled the article Sex Abuse Suit Dismissed in False-Memory Case on December 14, 1994. There were numerous cases brought to trial in the 1990s. Most included combinations of the misuse of hypnosis, guided imagery, sodium amytal, and anti-depressants.

The term "false memory syndrome" describes the phenomenon in which a mental therapy patient “remembers” an event such as childhood sexual abuse, that never occurred. The link between certain therapy practices and the development of psychological disorders such as dissociative identity disorder comes from malpractice suits and state licensure actions against therapists. These cases demonstrate the ease with which an individual can be led to exhibit dissociative symptoms, especially when hypnosis, sodium amytal, strong medications, or readings involving traumatic imagery magnify the effect of therapist suggestions or expectations. These cases also show that once the symptoms become established, the standard treatment modality often leads to a deterioration of the mental and emotional well-being of the patient.

In popular culture 
False Memory Syndrome has become so widely known that television shows and movies have been made about the phenomenon, such as the USA Network series The Sinner, which touches on the idea of recovering forgotten memories. The show focuses on a woman who kills a seemingly random man on the beach one day for playing a song that triggered a traumatic event from her past, which she has temporarily forgotten. Throughout the first season detectives try to trigger her memory and find a motive for her actions.

See also 
 Alien abduction
 False allegation of child sexual abuse
 McMartin preschool trial
 Memory bias
 Memory conformity
 Memory implantation

Footnotes

External links 
 
 
 Memory Wars is a website with information from all sides of the issue.  Primary resources include an extensive bibliography / abstract database and pre-print archive.  Also available are sections for criminal investigation, criminal defense and many other useful resources.
 False Memory Syndrome, Child & Woman Abuse Studies Unit of London Metropolitan University. Argues that "false memories" are real memories.
 False Memory Syndrome Foundation
 The false memory archive
  The false memory archive: did that really happen?

Memory biases
Memory disorders